Kurt Seidl (born 13 July 1947) is an Austrian sailor. He competed in the Flying Dutchman event at the 1972 Summer Olympics.

References

External links
 

1947 births
Living people
Austrian male sailors (sport)
Olympic sailors of Austria
Sailors at the 1972 Summer Olympics – Flying Dutchman
Place of birth missing (living people)